Khombok is a village in Badakhshan Province in north-eastern Afghanistan. It lies north of the Koh-i-Sar-i-Ushongen.

References

Populated places in Tagab District